Sergei Yegorovich Rozhkov (born 5 February 1943) is a retired Soviet football player and Russian coach.

Honours
 Soviet Top League winner: 1969.
 Soviet Cup winner: 1963, 1965.

International career
Rozhkov played his only game for USSR on November 4, 1964 in a friendly against Algeria.

External links
  Profile

1943 births
Living people
Soviet footballers
Soviet Union international footballers
Russian footballers
Russian football managers
FC Spartak Moscow players
FC Kairat players
Soviet Top League players
FC Tyumen managers
Russian Premier League managers
Expatriate footballers in Kazakhstan
Russian expatriate sportspeople in Kazakhstan
Association football midfielders
FC Spartak Ryazan players